Emina Bektas was the defending champion but chose not to participate.

Yuan Yue won the title, defeating Diana Shnaider in the final, 4–6, 6–3, 6–1.

Seeds

Draw

Finals

Top half

Bottom half

References

External Links
Main Draw

Henderson Tennis Open - Singles